The 1930–31 Connecticut Aggies men's basketball team represented Connecticut Agricultural College, now the University of Connecticut, in the 1930–31 collegiate men's basketball season. The Aggies completed the season with a 10–6 overall record. The Aggies were members of the New England Conference, where they ended the season with a 2–1 record. The Aggies played their home games at Hawley Armory in Storrs, Connecticut, and were led by fourth-year head coach Louis A. Alexander and returning fifth-year head coach Sumner A. Dole.

Schedule 

|-
!colspan=12 style=""| Regular Season

Schedule Source:

References 

UConn Huskies men's basketball seasons
Connecticut
1930 in sports in Connecticut
1931 in sports in Connecticut